Reimegrend Station is a railway station along the Bergen Line. It is located at the village of Reimegrend in the Raundalen valley in the municipality of Voss in Vestland county, Norway. The station is served by the Bergen Commuter Rail, operated by Vy Tog, with up to five daily departures in each direction. The station was opened in 1908. It was formerly the western turning point for snow clearing services along the Bergen Line. It is accessible by a spur of County Road 307.

External links
 Jernbaneverket's page on Reimegrend

Railway stations in Voss
Railway stations on Bergensbanen
Railway stations opened in 1908
1908 establishments in Norway